The UC San Diego Tritons baseball program represents the University of California San Diego at the National Collegiate Athletic Association's Division I level as a member of the Big West Conference (Big West). The Tritons have made several appearances in the Division II tournament, mostly under the leadership of former head coach Dan O'Brien. The Tritons reached the Division II College World Series for the First time in 2009, finishing fourth. In 2010, the Tritons enjoyed their most successful season to date, compiling a record of 54–8, and reaching the Division II national championship where they eventually fell.

The UC San Diego baseball team plays its home games at Triton Ballpark in La Jolla, which was renovated in 2014. In 2005, the Tritons were the CCAA league champions. In 2007 and 2008, they reached the NCAA West Regionals. In 2009, after winning the CCAA league and CCAA tournament, they advanced to the NCAA Division II College World Series under the leadership of coach Dan O'Brien and infielder Vance Albitz, where they placed fourth. In 2010, they were the College World Series runners-up and the CCAA league and tournament champions. In 2011 and 2012, they repeated as CCAA league and tournament champions, again reaching the NCAA West Regionals. They won the CCAA tournament in 2014 as well. In 2017, they were CCAA tournament runners-up and NCAA West Region champions, and placed second in the College World Series.

Triton baseball, like most UCSD athletic programs, transitioned to the NCAA Division I Big West Conference beginning in 2020. They will not be eligible for the Division I College World Series until the reclassification period ends.

Yearly Records

Notable alumni
 Kyle Abbott, Los Angeles Angels of Anaheim, Philadelphia Phillies
 Vance Albitz, St. Louis Cardinals
 Alex Cremidan, Arizona Diamondbacks
 Ryan Hill, Kansas City Royals
 Guido Knudson, Detroit Tigers
 Alon Leichman, Olympian, member of the Israel national baseball team, and assistant pitching coach for the Cincinnati Reds
 Randy Miller, Baltimore Orioles, Montreal Expos
 Dillon Moyer, Los Angeles Dodgers
 Bob Natal, Montreal Expos, Florida Marlins
 Tony York, Chicago Cubs

References